The Flower Bowl Stakes is a Grade II American thoroughbred horse race for fillies and mares aged four years old and older over a distance of  miles on the turf held annually in early September at Saratoga Race Course in Saratoga Springs, New York.

History

It had originally been run at Belmont Park from its inception in 1978 until 2020.

The race is part of the Breeders Cup Challenge series. The winner of the Flower Bowl automatically qualifies for the Breeders' Cup Filly & Mare Turf.

In 1987, the race was switched from turf to dirt due to heavy rain.

The race was named for Flower Bowl, a winner of the Ladies Handicap at Belmont Park and an outstanding broodmare.

In 2022 the event was downgraded by the American Graded Stakes Committee to Grade II status.

Records
Speed record:
  miles: 2:13.07  War Like Goddess (2021)
  miles: 1:59.05 Lahudood (GB) (2007)

Margins: 
 13 lengths – Dahlia's Dreamer (1994)

Most wins:
 2 – Riskaverse (2004, 2005)
 2 – Stephanie's Kitten (2014, 2015)

Most wins by a jockey:
 5 – John Velazquez (1998, 2006, 2012, 2014, 2019)

Most wins by a trainer:
 7 – Chad C. Brown (2011, 2014, 2015, 2016, 2018, 2019, 2022)

Most wins by an owner:
 5 – Peter M. Brant (1980, 1986, 1989, 2019, 2022)

Winners

Legend:

 
 

Notes:

§ Ran as an entry

See also
List of American and Canadian Graded races

References

Graded stakes races in the United States
Middle distance horse races for fillies and mares
Grade 2 stakes races in the United States
Turf races in the United States
Horse races in New York (state)
Recurring sporting events established in 1978
Breeders' Cup Challenge series
1978 establishments in New York (state)
Saratoga Race Course